Rodrigo Miguel Moreira (born 15 July 1996) is an Argentine professional footballer who plays as a centre-back for Quilmes.

Career

Club
Moreira's senior career with Independiente began in 2014 when he was a substitute for a Copa Argentina match with Belgrano, though he was unused in a 0–2 win on 28 July. On 5 August 2016, Moreira joined Primera B Nacional's San Martín on loan. He scored on his professional debut in a home draw versus Argentinos Juniors, which was the first of eight goals during 2016–17 for San Martín over forty-one appearances. He returned to Independiente in July 2017 and made his debut for the club on 8 September against Olimpo. On 30 June 2018, Moreira completed a return to former club San Martín; joining permanently. In August 2020, Moreira moved to Quilmes.

International
Moreira represented Argentina at U17 and U20 level. He won twelve caps for the U17s, winning the 2013 South American Under-17 Football Championship and scoring one goal (versus Ivory Coast) in six games at the 2013 FIFA U-17 World Cup in the United Arab Emirates. He played six times for the U20s, five of which came during the 2015 South American Youth Football Championship which Argentina won whilst the other cap came during the 2015 FIFA U-20 World Cup in New Zealand.

Career statistics
.

Honours

Club
Independiente
Copa Sudamericana: 2017

International
Argentina U17
South American Under-17 Football Championship: 2013

Argentina U20
South American Youth Football Championship: 2015

References

External links

1996 births
Living people
People from Constitución Department
Argentine footballers
Argentina youth international footballers
Argentina under-20 international footballers
Association football defenders
Argentine Primera División players
Primera Nacional players
Club Atlético Independiente footballers
San Martín de Tucumán footballers
Quilmes Atlético Club footballers
Sportspeople from Santa Fe Province